Thomas Cisson was an English academic  during the 16th-century:

Cisson graduated BD at Balliol College, Oxford; and was  Master of Balliol from 1512 to 1518.

Notes

16th-century English people
Alumni of Balliol College, Oxford
Masters of Balliol College, Oxford